Fuchsia paniculata  is a plant of the genus Fuchsia native to Central America. It belongs to the section Schufia and is most closely related to Fuchsia arborescens.

References

paniculata
Flora of Central America